The Canton of Amiens-5 is a canton situated in the department of the Somme and in the Picardie region of northern France.

Geography 
The canton is organised around the commune of Amiens in the arrondissement of Amiens.

Composition
At the French canton reorganisation which came into effect in March 2015, the canton was expanded from 2 to 3 communes:
Amiens (southern part) 
Boves
Cagny

See also
 Arrondissements of the Somme department
 Cantons of the Somme department
 Communes of the Somme department

References

Amiens 5
Canton 5